Conesus Amusement Hall, now known as Conesus Town Hall, is a historic multi-purpose community hall located at Conesus in Livingston County, New York. It was completed in 1888.  It is a 1-story, three-by-four-bay frame structure, approximately 30 feet by 70 feet.

It was listed on the National Register of Historic Places in 2005.

References

Event venues on the National Register of Historic Places in New York (state)
Buildings and structures in Livingston County, New York
National Register of Historic Places in Livingston County, New York